The 1919 Campeonato Paulista, organized by the APEA (Associação Paulista de Esportes Atléticos), was the 18th season of São Paulo's top association football league. Paulistano won the title for the 7th time. the top scorer was Ypiranga's Arthur Friedenreich with 26 goals.

System
The championship was disputed in a double-round robin system, with the team with the most points winning the title. The second round matches between the four bottom teams weren't held.

Championship

References

Campeonato Paulista seasons
Paulista